Zhengda Road Station is an underground metro station in Ningbo, Zhejiang, China. Zhengda Road Station situates on the crossing of Daqing South Road and Zhengda Road. Construction of the station started in December 2010 and it opened to service on September 26, 2015.

Exits 
Zhengda Road Station has 2 exits.

References 

Railway stations in Zhejiang
Railway stations in China opened in 2015
Ningbo Rail Transit stations